Ahlden is a municipality in the Heidekreis district in Lower Saxony, Germany. It is situated on the river Aller, approx. 15 km southwest of Bad Fallingbostel, and 30 km southeast of Verden.

Ahlden is located in the Samtgemeinde ("collective municipality") of Ahlden.

Famous people
Napoleonic wars officer Christian Friedrich Wilhelm von Ompteda, a Colonel in the British army's Kings German Legion who died in action at the Battle of Waterloo was from Ahlden.

See also
 Ahlden House

References

Heidekreis